The  is a film festival established in 1985. The event was held biennially from 1985 to 1991 and annually thereafter. Along with the Shanghai International Film Festival, it is one of Asia's competitive film festivals, and is considered to be the largest film festival in Asia and the only Japanese festival accredited by the FIAPF.

The awards handed out during the festival have changed throughout its existence, but the Tokyo Grand Prix, handed to the best film, has stayed as the top award. Other awards that have been given regularly include the Special Jury Award and awards for best actor, best actress and best director.

In recent years, the festival's main events have been held over one week in late October, at the Roppongi Hills development.  Events include open-air screenings, voice-over screenings, and appearances by actors, as well as seminars and symposiums related to the film market.

Tokyo Grand Prix winners

Best Director Award 
1985 - Péter Gothár, Time Stands Still
1987 - Lana Gogoberidze, Oromtriali
1989 - Rajko Grlic, That Summer of White Roses
1991 - Alan Parker, The Commitments
1992 - Ji-yeong Jeong, White Badge
1993 - Taylor Hackford, Blood In, Blood Out
1994 - Ho Yim, The Day the Sun Turned Cold 
1995 - Joseph Novoa, Sicario
1996 - Tian-Ming Wu, The King of Masks
1997 - Ademir Kenović, The Perfect Circle
1998 - Guy Ritchie, Lock, Stock and Two Smoking Barrels
1999 - Martha Fiennes, Onegin
2000 - Alejandro González Iñárritu, Amores Perros
2001 - (tied) Reza Mirkarimi, Under the Moonlight and Gjergj Xhuvani, Slogans
2002 - Carlo Rola, Sass
2003 - Chris Valentien, Santa Smokes
2004 - Chan-sang Lim, The President's Barber
2005 - Kichitaro Negishi, What the Snow Brings
2006 - Jonathan Dayton and Valerie Faris, Little Miss Sunshine
2007 - Peter Howitt, Dangerous Parking
2008 - Sergey Dvortsevoy, Tulpan
2009 - Kamen Kalev, Eastern Plays
2010 - Nir Bergman, Intimate Grammar
2011 - Ruben Östlund, Play
2012 - Lorraine Lévy, The Other Son
2013 - Benedikt Erlingsson, Of Horses and Men
2014 - Joshua Safdie and Ben Safdie, Heaven Knows What
2015 - Mustafa Kara, Cold of Kalandar
2016 - Hana Jusic, Quit Staring at My Plate
2017 - Edmund Yeo, Aqérat (We, The Dead)
2018 - Edoardo De Angelis, The Vice of Hope
2019 - Saeed Roustaee, Just 6.5
2021 - Darezhan Omirbaev, Poet
2022 - Rodrigo Sorogoyen, The Beasts

Best Actor Award 
2014 - Robert Więckiewicz, Pod mocnym aniolem
2015 - Roland Møller and Louis Hofmann, Land of Mine
2016 - Paolo Ballesteros, Die Beautiful
2017 - Duan Yihong, The Looming Storm
2018 - Jesper Christensen, Before the Frost
2019 - Navid Mohammadzadeh, Just 6.5
2021 - Amir Aghaei, Fatih Al, Bariş Yildiz, Onur Buldu, The Four Walls
2022 - Denis Menochet, The Beasts

Best Actress Award 
1987 - Rachel Ward, The Good Wife
1991 - Zhao Lirong, The Spring Festival
1994 - Debra Winger, A Dangerous Woman
1995 - Yasuko Tomita, The Christ of Nanjing
1997 - Rene Liu and Jing Tseng, Murmur of Youth
2004 - Mirella Pascual, Whisky
2005 - Helena Bonham Carter, Conversations with Other Women
2006 - Abigail Breslin, Little Miss Sunshine
2007 - Shefali Shah, Gandhi, My Father
2008 - Félicité Wouassi, With a Little Help from Myself
2009 - Julie Gayet, Eight Times Up
2010 - Fan Bing Bing, Buddha Mountain
2011 - Glenn Close, Albert Nobbs
2012 - Neslihan Atagül, Araf - Somewhere in Between
2013 - Eugene Domingo, Barber's Tales
2014 - Rie Miyazawa, Pale Moon
2015 - Glória Pires, Nise - The Heart of Madness
2016 - Lene Cecilia Sparrok, Sami Blood
2017 - Adeline D'Hermy, Maryline
2018 - Pina Turco, The Vice of Hope
2019 - Nadia Tereszkiewicz, Only the Animals
2021 - Julia Chávez, The Other Tom
2022 - Aline Kuppenheim, 1976

Special Jury Prize 
2013 - Bending the Rules, Behnam Behzadi
2014 - The Lesson,  Kristina Grozeva and Petar Valchanov
2015 - All Three of Us, Kheiron
2016 - Sami Blood
2017 - Crater, Silvia Luzi and Luca Bellino
2018 - Before the Frost, Michael Noer
2019 - Atlantis, Valentyn Vasyanovych
2021 - La Civil, Teodora Ana Mihai
2022 - World War III, Houman Seyyedi

Best Screenplay Award 
2017 - Euthanizer, Teemu Nikki
2018 - Amanda, Mikhael Hers and Maud Ameline
2019 - A Beloved Wife, Shin Adachi

Best Artistic Contribution Award 
2012 - Pankaj Kumar, Ship of Theseus
2014 - Ispytanie,  Aleksandr Kott
2015 - Family Film,  Olmo Omerzu
2017 - The Looming Storm
2018 - The White Crow
2019 - Chaogtu with Sarula
2021 - Crane Lantern
2022 - Peacock Lament, Sanjeewa Pushpakumara

Audience Award 
2013 - Red Family, Lee Ju-hyoung
2014 - Pale Moon,  Daihachi Yoshida
2015 - God Willing,  Edoardo Falcone
2016 - Die Beautiful, Jun Lana
2017 - Tremble All You Want, Akiko Ooku
2018 - Another World, Junji Sakamoto
2019 - Only the Animals, Dominik Moll
2020 - Hold Me Back, Akiko Ooku (sole award given)
2021 - Just Remembering, Daigo Matsui
2022 - By the Window, Rikiya Imaizumi

Asian Future Best Film Award 
2014 - Bedone marz بدون مرز, Amirhossein Asgari امیرحسین عسگری
2015 - Pimpaka Towira,  The Island Funeral
2016 - Birdshot
2017 - Passage of Life
2018 - A First Farewell
2019 - Summer Knight
2021 - World, Northern Hemisphere
2022 - Butterflies Live Only One Day, Mohammadreza Vatandoust

Japanese Cinema Splash Best Picture Award 

2014 - 100 Yen Love, Masaharu Take
2015 - Ken and Kazu, Hiroshi Shoji
2017 - Of Love & Law, Hikaru Toda
2016 - Poolsideman, Hirobumi Watanabe
2018 - Lying to Mom, Katsumi Nojiri
2019 - i -Documentary of the Journalist-, Tatsuya Mori

Tokyo Gemstone Award 
2017 - Mayu Matsuoka, Shizuka Ishibashi, Adeline D'Hermy, Daphne Low
2018 - Lien Binh Phat, Karelle Tremblay, Mai Kiryu, Nijiro Murakami
2019 - Josefine Frida Pettersen, Sairi Ito, Riru Yoshina, Yui Sakuma

References

External links
Official site of the Tokyo International Film Festival
English site of the Tokyo International Film Festival
Tokyo International Film Festival at the Internet Movie Database

 
Film festivals in Tokyo
Recurring events established in 1985
October events
1985 establishments in Japan
Annual events in Japan
Autumn events in Japan